Legend Street One is an album by multi-instrumentalist and composer Joe McPhee recorded in 1996 and first released on the CIMP label.

Reception

Allmusic reviewer Thom Jurek states "the current forms are transmuted, offering glimpses of the newer tonal frontiers he has encountered, but the sonorities aside, the feeling of the music remains, with a similar emphasis placed on timbres that highlight rather than consume either a melodic line or an improvisation".

Track listing 
All compositions by Joe McPhee except as indicated
 "Loweville" (Frank Lowe, Joe McPhee) - 2:12
 "What We Do" - 7:11
 "Memorium" - 5:33
 "For Panama, Parts 1-2" (Charles Moffett) - 7:42
 "Up, Over, and Out" - 9:15
 "July the 13th" - 5:21
 "Not Yet" - 6:04
 "Trading Space" - 9:40

Personnel 
Joe McPhee - pocket trumpet, tenor saxophone, alto saxophone, flugelhorn
Frank Lowe - tenor saxophone
David Prentice - violin
Charles Moffett - drums

References 

Joe McPhee albums
1996 albums
CIMP albums